The Bintang lowland bent-toed gecko (Cyrtodactylus bintangrendah) is a species of gecko endemic to peninsular Malaysia and neighbouring areas of Thailand.

References

Cyrtodactylus
Reptiles described in 2012